Ell Pond is a lake in Middlesex County, in the U.S. state of Massachusetts.

Ell Pond, formerly also written "L Pond", was so named on account of its L-shape. A variant name is "Crystal Pond".

References

Lakes of Middlesex County, Massachusetts